Geraldine Fitch (born 7 April 1954) is a Canadian long-distance runner. She competed in the women's 3000 metres at the 1984 Summer Olympics.

References

1954 births
Living people
Athletes (track and field) at the 1984 Summer Olympics
Canadian female long-distance runners
Olympic track and field athletes of Canada
Athletes (track and field) at the 1979 Pan American Games
Pan American Games bronze medalists for Canada
Pan American Games medalists in athletics (track and field)
Athletes (track and field) at the 1982 Commonwealth Games
Commonwealth Games competitors for Canada
Athletes from Toronto
Medalists at the 1979 Pan American Games
21st-century Canadian women
20th-century Canadian women